Intersport GmbH is a French sporting goods retailer based in Bern, Switzerland. Its purchasing division is IIC-Intersport International Corporation.

It has a presence in 5800 locations and in 65 countries.

History

In 1924, La Hutte company, Scout equipment specialist and future Intersport, was born. Very quickly, this small company develops, spreads and opens its types of equipment to the public. At the end of the 1950s, to resist the competition, four national groups (from Germany, the Netherlands, Belgium and France) created the first European sporting goods association under the Intersport label.

Founded in 1968 and based on the Intersport label, Intersport International Corporation (IIC) grew out of the alliance of ten national purchasing centers to create an international organization around the sporting goods. From 1983, IIC has developed some international sporting brands: McKinley, Etirel, and TecnoPro. In 1989, it was Nakamura's turn to be created. These brands were joined by ProTouch and Energetics in 1992 and FireFly in 1998. The international slogan of Intersport is "The heart of sport".

Activity

Between 2010 and 2018, the group's turnover rose by one billion euros.

In 2016, the Intersport cooperative group recorded a turnover of 1.8 billion euros. In 2017, the group recorded a total growth of 10% and its turnover reached the symbolic mark of 2 billion euros. This increase allows the brand to conquer 3% of market share (22% in 2017 vs 19% in 2016).

In 2018, the group posted a comfortable growth of 9.1% to 2.2 billion euros of turnover. An additional 200 million euros per year for the second year in a row. The Intersport network had 660 stores and 9,500 employees at the end of 2018.

Stores

See also
Intersport Arena

References

Sporting goods retailers
Retail companies established in 1968
1968 establishments in France
Companies based in Bern
Multinational companies headquartered in Switzerland
Swiss brands
Retail companies of Switzerland